The Synodontidae or lizardfishes are benthic (bottom-dwelling) marine and estuarine bony fishes that belong to the aulopiform fish order, a diverse group of marine ray-finned fish consisting of some 15 extant and several prehistoric families. They are found in tropical and subtropical marine waters throughout the world.

They have slender, somewhat cylindrical bodies, and heads that superficially resemble those of lizards. The dorsal fin is located in the middle of the back, and accompanied by a small adipose fin placed closer to the tail. They have mouths full of sharp teeth, even on the tongue.

Some species in the subfamily Harpadontinae live in brackish estuaries. They prefer sandy environments, and typically have body colours that help to camouflage them in such environments.

The larvae of lizardfishes are free-swimming. They are distinguished by the presence of black blotches in their guts, clearly visible through their transparent, scaleless skin.

While it may not be as well-known as some other types of fish, it is still consumed in many cultures and can be used in a variety of culinary preparations.

Taxonomy
Three genera of the Synodontidae are known to inhabit the western Atlantic, including Synodus, represented by six species, Saurida, represented by four species, and Trachinocephalus, represented by a single species.  The six species comprising the genus Synodus are S. intermedius, S. saurus, S. synodus, S. foetens, S. bondi, and S. macrostigmus. The four species comprising the genus Saurida are S. umeyoshii, S. pseudotumbil, S. undosquamis, and S. tumbil. The single species of Trachinocephalus is T. myops. The extinct Argillichthys is represented only by a single species, A. toombsi, from the Eocene-aged London Clay formation.

See also
 Bombay duck
 Deepsea lizardfish
 USS Lizardfish (a US submarine)

Notes

References

 
Ray-finned fish families
Taxa named by Theodore Gill